GEA Refrigeration Technologies GmbH, with headquarters in Bochum, Germany, is a developer, manufacturer, and supplier of industrial refrigeration and freezer technology. Its product portfolio includes piston compressors, screw compressors, chillers, tunnel freezers, carton and spiral freezers, valves and valve sets, driers, and exhaust ventilators.

The company primarily supplies the following industrial sectors: the food and beverage industries; the petrochemical, chemical, and pharmaceutical industries; fishing ships; natural gas liquefaction; transport activities (trucks, buses, and railways); supermarkets; leisure facilities; and zoos.

GEA Refrigeration Technologies is part of the GEA Group.

Founding 

The history of GEA Refrigeration Technologies began in 1858, when Willem Grasso founded his forge Willem Grasso Stoomsmederij in 's-Hertogenbosch, the Netherlands. Grasso began by manufacturing steam machines and tools, followed by steam hammers and butter-making systems. His son Henri took over the flourishing business in 1894.

The invention of margarine in 1896 gave the company another major push upward and made it famous for its special margarine machines. In the same year, Grasso founded a separate business unit for refrigeration technology.

The Second World War severely damaged the company, which caused it to cease production of margarine machines. After the war, Grasso concentrated on refrigeration technology.

Since 1991 the company is part of GEA Group. Step by step, the company acquired other companies and rounded off its portfolio of products and services. In 1993 GEA Refrigeration Technologies bought GEA Grenco, a manufacturer of refrigeration systems for the food/beverages and marine industries. One year later, GEA Refrigeration Technologies acquired the compressor specialist Kühlautomat Berlin GmbH (KAB, formerly VEB Kühlautomat Berlin). In 1995 the company was joined by the Italian compressor producer GEA Refrigeration Italy S.p.A. In 2004 GEA Refrigeration Technologies acquired Goedhart Holding BV, a Dutch maker of air coolers and refrigeration coils. In 1999 the company ILKA MAFA Kältemaschinenbau GmbH – producer of piston and screw-compressor chillers – became a member of GEA Group.

In the following years, and until the restructuring of GEA Group in January 2009, the company acquired the specialist for industrial refrigeration systems, FES, Inc. (today known as GEA FES, Inc.), of the US. It also bought Morris & Young Ltd., of London; the German valve manufacturer AWP (now GEA AWP GmbH); as well as Aerofreeze (now GEA Aerofreeze), the Canadian maker of freezer systems for the food industry. In addition, since 2009 the companies Eurotek (now Eurotek Engineering Ltd.) of Great Britain and Intec (today GEA Intec) are also part of the GEA Group.

Since restructuring of GEA Group, GEA Refrigeration Technologies constitutes one of the present six Segments of the Group. In this process, Goedhart moved to the Segment GEA Heat Exchangers.

In 2010 GEA Refrigeration Technologies acquired the refrigeration specialist Bock Kältemaschinen GmbH (today GEA Bock GmbH), in Frickenhausen, Germany. With this acquisition, GEA Refrigeration Technologies expanded its portfolio of piston and screw compressors in the low- and medium-performance ranges.

For the expansion of the freezer portfolio GEA Refrigeration Technologies acquired the conveyor-belt specialist QPM Manufacturing, Bellevue, Washington, United States in 2011. QPM produces steel conveyor belts for the transport of food products in ovens and freezers.

Brands 
 AWP
 Bock
 Grasso

External links 
 Homepage of GEA Industrial Refrigeration
 Homepage of the GEA Group AG
 Homepage of GEA Freezing, formerly branded as Aerofreeze

Manufacturing companies of Germany
Companies based in Bochum
Manufacturing companies established in 2010
German companies established in 2010